Ricardo Rossel Sirot (12 May 1841 in Lima – 6 December 1909 in Barranco) was a Peruvian author, poet, politician, scholar, and entrepreneur, and the founder of the Club Literario de Lima.

Biography 

Ricardo Rossel was born in Lima to the French immigrant Eugenio Rossel, a gentleman from the Nîmes region of Languedoc, who arrived to Peru in 1826, and established one of the first French imports stores in Lima, and Carmen Sirot, a distinguished lady from Lima. He had 4 siblings, Manuel Eugenio, Carlos Amador, Rosalia and Isidro.

Rossel studied at the Seminario de Santo Toribio, earning all the first prizes and also a gold medal in his final year of higher education. In the early years of his schooling, he showed a natural disposition and interest in literature. Reading became one of his favorites pastimes, reading eagerly the classics of the epoch that helped shape his style and literary spirit. At the age of 13, he composed his first verses.

His father died in 1859, which compelled him to take charge of the family business. He also devoted himself to the agricultural industry until 1874 when he established a merchant store that bore his name in the city of Callao . He also explored the mining industry, becoming manager and partner of a mining company in the Andes region.

Ricardo Rossel married Matilde Dulanto Valcárcel, daughter of Manuel Cipriano Dulanto, a hero of the Independence war and beloved resident of the city of Callao, and María de los Santos Valcárcel. They had five children: Ricardo Marcos, Carlos Amador, Eugene, Jose Alberto and Maria.

He held municipal positions in the local government of Callao, and served on various boards and commissions officers for commercial and economic affairs, and was also appointed President of the Commercial Court of the same city. Rossel was also elected diputado (congressman) for Lima during the government of president Remigio Morales Bermúdez where he received fame as a great speaker.
Then in 1895 President Nicolás de Pierola entrusted him with the organization and management of the office responsible for administering the taxing on salt. 

Rossel was a man mostly dedicated to commerce and industry, but with a special passion for poetry and writing, which compelled him, in his few spare moments, to create works and compositions of different kinds: literary discourses, translations, reports, press articles, novels, stories, and poetry. For this reason, perhaps, he did not create an extensive collection of works.

He was founder and enthusiastic member of the Club Literario de Lima, and was elected President of its section of literature from 1875 to 1881, then reappointed in 1885 for the same office until 1886, when the Club Literario became the Ateneo de Lima, and was elected its vice president for several years. He was a member of the Real Academia Española since 1886.

He did an analysis of the works of Manuel Bretón de los Herreros, which earned him deserved praise from the press of Latin America and Spain. In 1877, he won the International Literary Contest held in Chile, with his legend "Catalina Tupac Roca" receiving a gold medal. For this reason, the government of Peru awarded him a second gold medal and another one from the Literary Club.
Some of his works that also deserve special mention, are the legends "La Huerfana de Ate” (the Orphan of Ate) and "La Roca de la viuda” (The Widow‘s rock), "El Salto del Fraile” (the Jump of the Monk) which he dedicated to Ricardo Palma and the academic speech that inaugurated the works of the Section of Literature and Fine Arts of El Ateneo de Lima in January 1886.

His fluency in French, which he learned with his father since he was a child, allowed him to translate into Spanish French poetry, which was very appreciated in his time, from authors like Alphonse de Lamartine, Alfred de Musset, and Victor Hugo, and were published in different media.

He witnessed one of the saddest chapters in Peruvian history, the War of the Pacific, serving with generosity and patriotism to his country. 
He organized a public fund raising in Callao to buy a naval ship, and donated himself with generosity. As member of the Army Reserve Battalion, he was called on active duty and assigned to the Redoubt # 2 in Miraflores, confronting a ruthless enemy, and seeing with sadness and anger the looting and stealing of the books of the National Library by the Chilean forces. According to the report of Ricardo Palma, from a total of 35 to 50,000 volumes, only slightly more than 700 books were left. While trying to overcome the pain, and left with no choice, the library had to be restored, and along with Ricardo Palma and other friends, he began collecting books from everywhere, the saddest task, yet the most dignified a lover of reading, writing, and literature could ever have imagined to embrace.

One of the greatest events in the history of Spanish literature took place in 1892, at the four hundredth anniversary of the arrival of the Spaniards to America: The Hispanic American Literary Congress which gathered in Madrid the greatest writers of Latin America and Spain. Ricardo Palma and Ricardo Rossel attended this great event representing the Peruvian team. 

Ricardo Rossel was a man of many talents; his poetry and the quality of his literary skills were innate tools of his personality and character, which he cultured through study and dedication. His brilliant oratory led him to give speeches on many occasions, which were an expression of the highest quality of the Castilian language, and were considered academic discourses that were reproduced in various newspapers and magazines across the country. 

During his bohemian life, the literary gatherings became more pleasant with his singing and the sound of his guitar. He was a regular participant of the famous tertulias of the Argentinean writer Juana Manuela Gorriti while she lived in Lima. It is known that at his home since childhood, everyone played a musical instrument or sang, art perhaps inculcated especially by his mother, who appreciated singing and music from a young age. It was perhaps Ricardo Rossel and the poets of that time, who by putting music to their poetry gave creation to Peruvian folk music which evolved over time and then turned into the waltzes and polkas people still play and enjoy these days in Peru.

That mysterious flame of his genius was extinguished forever on December 6, 1909 at the city of Barranco, at age 68 of a life well spent. As he wished, his thoughts printed here will live on these pages, on earth, they shall never die.

References 
 
 Biografia de Ricardo Rossel

External links 
 
 Ricado Rossel Sirot
 Genealogy and family tree of Ricardo Rossel

1841 births
1909 deaths
People from Lima
Peruvian male writers